is a Japanese company specializing in adult visual novels. Founded in April 2005, their first game, Nursery Rhyme was released later that year. Their third work, Tayutama: Kiss on my Deity, was released in 2008, and was later adapted into an anime and manga.

Lump of Sugar Broadcasting 
Lump of Sugar Broadcasting is an internet radio show which started airing on September 13, 2007. It is sponsored by Russell and Broccoli, hosted by Hina Nakase and Hirorin, and a number of guests have also attended. It is currently ongoing.

Guests 
 Haruka Shimotsuki
 Yui Sakakibara
 Fumitake Moekibara
 Kicco
 Noriko Rikimaru
 Yui Ogura
 Keito Mizukiri
 Kota Oshita
 Riko Korie

Works 
 Nursery Rhyme
 Itsuka, Todoku, Ano Sora ni.
 Tayutama: Kiss on my Deity
 Tayutama: It's happy days
 Prism Rhythm
 Hello, Good-bye
 Diamic Days
 Gaku Ou: The Royal Seven Stars
 Gaku Ou: It's Heartful Days!!
 Hanairo Heptagram
 Magical Charming!
 Sekai to Sekai no Mannaka de
 Unmei Senjou no Phi
 Rensou Relation
 Kodomo no Asobi
 Tayutama 2: You're the Only One
 Tayutama 2: After Stories
 Yorite Konoha wa Kurenai ni
 Wakaba-iro no Quartet
 Nekotsuku, Sakura
 Madohi Shiroki no Kamikakushi
 Yumahorome ~Toki o Tometa Yakata de Asu o Sagasu Maigo-tachi~

Upcoming Releases
 Arcana Alchemia (12/23/2022)

External links 
 

Hentai companies
Eroge
Video game companies established in 2005
Video game companies of Japan
Japanese companies established in 2005